Wes Kittley is the current head coach of the Texas Tech Red Raiders track and field team. He has produced several national champions and Olympians in Sally Kipyego and Kennedy Kithuka.

Career

Abilene Christian, 1983-1999
Kittley was the women's track and field head coach at Abilene Christian University (ACU) from 1985-99. In 1993, the Men's and Women's programs merged. While at ACU, Kittley won his first NCAA Women's Outdoor Track and Field Championship at the Division II level in 1985. He would go on to win the Championship in 1986, 1987, and 1988. Kittley's teams would also win many NCAA Women's Indoor Track and Field Championships during his tenure in 1988, 1989, 1990, 1991, 1993, 1994, 1995, 1996, 1997, 1998, and 1999. Kittley's program won 29 national track and field championships, the most in Division I and II combined, and three short of the all-time record held by Jim Steen of Kenyon College.

During his 15-year tenure at ACU, Kittley coached 12 Olympic qualifiers, 3 Pan-American Games athletes, five World University Games athletes, 16 athletes who qualified for the world championships, and one United States national champion.

Texas Tech, 2000-Present

In 2000, Kittley departed Abilene Christian to accept the head coaching job at Texas Tech University. In 2019, the Red Raiders won the Division I men's outdoor national championship. During his tenure, Kittley has produced many national champions:

In addition to national champions, Kittley is responsible for producing 205 All-Americans, and 111 Big 12 Conference champions. He guided Texas Tech to its first Big 12 team title in school history during the 2005 season. Kennedy Kithuka, one of Kittley's athletes, went undefeated during the 2012 season and was named the 2012 Male Athlete of the Year for Cross Country. The men's team would win the Big 12 Conference again in 2014 on their home track. Kittley was named the Big 12 Conference Men's Coach of the Year for the team's performance. The Red Raiders swept the Big 12 Championships in 2018, winning both the indoor and outdoor titles for the first time in program history.

Kittley was named the Women's Regional Coach of the Year in 2009 and 2012. He picked up the Men's Regional Coach of the Year award in 2015, 2017, and 2018. In 2006, he was also named to the Lone Star Conference's Hall of Honor.

Kittley's contract with Texas Tech received a 5-year extension in August 2014 to 2019 with a base salary of $265,000 increasing by $5,000 every year.

Olympic medalists

Personal life

Kittley was born in Rule, Texas and is married to Linda Rhoads. They have three sons including Zach, who serves as offensive coordinator and quarterbacks coach at Texas Tech university.

Kittley is a graduate of Abilene Christian University, with a bachelor's degree in Physical Education, and a master's degree in school administration. He was a three-time NAIA All-American in the 800M while he attended.

References

External links
 Texas Tech profile

Year of birth missing (living people)
Living people
Texas Tech Red Raiders track and field coaches
Abilene Christian Wildcats men's track and field athletes
Abilene Christian Wildcats track and field coaches
Abilene Christian University alumni
Abilene Christian University faculty
People from Haskell County, Texas
Sportspeople from Texas
American male middle-distance runners
Texas Tech Red Raiders cross country coaches